The Village Restaurant was a 550-seat family-owned Italian restaurant in Portland, Maine, United States. It was in business at 112 Newbury Street for 71 years, from 1936 to 2007, and was one of the few restaurants in the Old Port during the restaurant's existence. It stood across Hancock Street from the Shipyard Brewing Company, in a space now occupied by condominiums — The Village at Ocean Gate — which maintain The Village's name.

The restaurant was renovated in 1998.

After increasing competition from the numerous restaurants opening to take advantage of Portland’s "foodie town" status, the restaurant's owner decided to close the business, rather than spend an estimated $500,000 on work the building needed. It was under contract in 2006 and sold in 2007. There was a plan to downsize the restaurant and include it on the first floor of the condominium, but this did not come to fruition.

History
The restaurant was founded as a twenty-seat café in 1936 by Vincenzo (1892–1981) and Maria Reali (1884–1967), "Feature Obituary: Amedeo Reali, 83, Village Cafe owner, devoted to family" – Portland Press Herald, July 24, 2010 the grandfather of the restaurant's last owner John Reali. Amedeo Reali (1926–2010), John's father, took it over after Vincenzo's retirement. He had initially only planned on helping out for two weeks upon returning from service in the Navy during World War II. Amedeo Reali died in 2010, aged 83.

In December 2007, after 71 years in business, the restaurant closed. A rumored smaller version of the restaurant did not happen.

John Reali won the Restaurateur of the Year Award from the Maine Restaurant Association in 2001. Amedeo Reali won the Lifetime Achievement Award in 2004.

In the 2010s, the historic restaurant was torn down and replaced with the Bay House condominium project. The Bay House, an 85-unit condo on Middle and Newbury Streets, was built by Reger Dasco Properties. Since then, the neighborhood has been filled in with high-end condos, hotels and offices. In 2021, a one-unit condo in the Bay House was listed for sale for $625,000.

References

Restaurants established in 1936
Restaurants in Portland, Maine
Defunct restaurants in the United States
1936 establishments in Maine
2007 disestablishments in Maine